Marcus Berg (1714-1761) was a Swedish memoir writer. 

He was abducted by Barbary pirates and spent to years as a slave to the sultan of Morocco, before he was bought free and able to return to Sweden. His memoirs about his years as a slave in Morocco was published and attracted a lot of attention.

References

 Berg, Marcus, Svensk slav i Marocko: en bearbetning av Beskrifning öfwer barbariska slafweriet uti kejsardömet Fez och Marocco i korthet författad af Marcus Berg, som tillika med många andra christna det samma utstådt tvenne år och siu dagar, och derifrån blifwit utlöst tillika med åtta stycken andra swenska den 30 augusti 1756, Textab, Arboga, 1993

1761 deaths
1714 births
Moroccan slaves
18th-century Swedish writers
18th-century slaves
Swedish memoirists
People who wrote slave narratives
18th-century memoirists